Star Trek: Lower Decks is an American adult animated television series created by Mike McMahan for the streaming service CBS All Access. It is the ninth series in the Star Trek franchise, and was launched in 2020 as part of executive producer Alex Kurtzman's expansion of the franchise. Lower Decks is the first animated series created for All Access, and the first animated Star Trek series since the 1973–74 series Star Trek: The Animated Series. It follows the support crew of the U.S.S. Cerritos in the year 2380.

Tawny Newsome, Jack Quaid, Noël Wells, and Eugene Cordero voice "lower decks" crew members of the Cerritos, with Dawnn Lewis, Jerry O'Connell, Fred Tatasciore, and Gillian Vigman also starring. Characters seen previously in Star Trek also appear, including John de Lancie as Q, Jonathan Frakes as William Riker, and Marina Sirtis as Deanna Troi. The following list includes the main cast of Lower Decks, all guest characters with recurring roles, and a supplementary list of other noteworthy guests.

Overview
  = Main cast (credited main cast member) 
  = Recurring cast (3+ appearances in a season)
  = Guest cast (1–2 appearances per season)

Main characters

Mariner
 (née Freeman), or simply Mariner (voiced by Tawny Newsome) is a human ensign aboard the U.S.S. Cerritos and the daughter of Captain Freeman. Newsome described the character as irreverent and a rule-breaker, though she is actually "very good at all things Starfleet, she just doesn't care" and has been demoted several times. Newsome added that Mariner "just wants to ride her skateboard and eat her piece of pizza in peace, man." Mike McMahan confirmed that Captain Amina Ramsey was her former lover at Starfleet Academy. The namesake for Mariner is McMahan's own sister, Beckett Mariner McMahan. In June 2019, Mike McMahan, the series and character creator, hinted that Lower Decks would feature mainly original characters. The next month, Tawny Newsome was cast as Beckett Mariner, one of those new characters. As for the second season, McMahan also felt the writers did not adequately address LGBTQ characters and relationships in the first season, especially since it was their intention to portray Mariner as bisexual which is never made explicit. He said the second season would address this better. Sometime between the end of Season 2 and Season 3 she begins a relationship with Andorian officer Jennifer Sh'reyan. However, they break up due to a misunderstanding during Mariner's unauthorized interview with Victoria Nuzé. In the end of the Season 3 finale, Mariner shows no signs of getting back with Jennifer.

Furthermore, for much of the first season, when production was impacted due to the COVID-19 pandemic, Newsome recorded her lines in a recording studio set up at her house. Newsome began recording voice overs for the season in early June, in a recording studio which was not possible in the previous season due to the COVID-19 pandemic. She was unable to record with Quaid, as she did on the first season, due to his commitments filming The Boys.

In the first season of the series, Mariner wants to keep her relation with Captain Freeman a secret to the point of only using her mother's maiden name. In the second episode, "Envoys", Mariner is revealed to be the long-time friend of K'orin, a Klingon warrior. She convinces Boimler to stay at Starfleet after K'orin ditches them on an alien planet and Boimler cannot survive on his own in the environment. When Freeman wants Mariner transferred to another ship in "Moist Vessel", the captain gives Mariner continually harder and harder jobs, hoping she will grow bored and tired of the constant work and give up, then transfer herself. In the next episode, Mariner attempts to convince Boimler that his new girlfriend, Barbara, is an evil alien masquerading as human to seduce and cause harm to him, but instead the two find they have much in common and become friends. In the season finale, Boimler inadvertently reveals to the whole crew Mariner's connection to Freeman, but the mother and daughter make amends and reconnect.

In the third season, Mariner's mother is arrested and Mariner is determined to clear her name, including hijacking the drydocked Cerritos, but it turned out to be unnecessary since her mother's arrest was actually part of a Starfleet Security sting to expose a criminal conspiracy. Regardless of her intentions, Captain Freeman decides that she has been too lenient to her daughter and puts her on a strict probationary status under First Officer Ransom's command with full authority to have her dishonorably discharged if she ever disobeys him. Although enduring the senior officer's eccentric priorities is frustrating through this period, Commander Ransom is eventually satisfied that Mariner has shown satisfactory performance to allow the probation to lift. 

However, when the Cerritos hosts a reporter while on Operation: Swing By, a followup mission with planets visited previously, Captain Freeman is met with hostile questions in her own interview about embarrassing previous incidents of the ship's mission and assumes that Mariner had revealed them in a previous interview made without her authorization. Incensed, a sentiment shared by the crew outside of Mariner's closest friends, the Captain reassigns Mariner to Starbase 80, only to discover to her profound chagrin that Mariner's actual testimony was the only interview unambiguously positive while the rest of the crew was actually responsible for carelessly admitting the embarrassing facts in their own interview. In response, Mariner resigns her commission and joins a rogue archeologist in her treasure hunting. However, she soon finds that she values Starfleet's ideals and returns to save her mother's ship from an out of control Starfleet autonomous vehicle with the rest of the California class fleet. With that, Mariner is reinstated and welcomed back into Starfleet, while forgiving her mother while declaring that she now wants to seriously advance in the ranks as an officer.

Boimler

Brad Boimler

Bradward "Brad" Boimler, or simply Boimler (voiced by Jack Quaid) is a human ensign aboard the Cerritos, Boimler is a stickler for the rules and will need to learn how to improvise if he is to become a captain one day. Quaid described the character by saying "he would nail the written portion of the driving test with flying colors but once it actually got to him being in the car, it would be a complete and total disaster." Quaid originally auditioned for the role of Rutherford. Quaid additionally called Boimler the direct opposite of friend Beckett Mariner. According to Variety, "while great at sci-fi stuff, he's completely bound to the rules. He doesn't know how to follow his gut, and if he wants to be a captain some day he's going to have to learn how to improvise." Brad Boimler has also been likened to Quaid's character on the Amazon Prime Video original series The Boys, Hughie. Rolling Stones called Boimler "easily flustered try-hard who doesn't understand why his rigorous rule following goes ignored by Captain Carol Freeman" but likened the character nonetheless. In July 2019, Quaid was cast as Boimler.

In the beginning of season one, Boimler is tasked with keeping his friend and co-worker Beckett Mariner in check by the USS Cerritos captain Carol Freeman, who, unbeknownst to him, is Mariner's mother. He sees his friend smuggling supplies to a pair of poor farmer down on a planet the Cerritos is making second contact to, and so he must decide to either follow the rules and report Mariner's behavior or break the rules like Mariner and do what's right. In the end, Boimler decides not to help Mariner but also not to report her. At the end of the first season, after discovering that Mariner is actually the daughter of Captain Freeman, he gets transferred to the USS Titan, serving under Captain William Riker, much to Mariner's dismay. With the inadvertent creation of his clone, William Boilmer, Brad is returned with a demotion to the Cerritos, but soon begins to distinguish himself as an officer of considerable talent and command potential.

William Boimler
In the beginning of the second season, in "Kayshon, His Eyes Open", Boimler is duplicated by a transporter malfunction, and is assigned back to the Cerritos while the duplicated Boimler remains onboard the Titan and takes on the new name William Boimler after William Riker. He later fakes his death to join Section 31.

Tendi
, or simply Tendi (voiced by Noël Wells) is an Orion ensign in the medical bay aboard the Cerritos, Tendi is a big fan of Starfleet, who is always thrilled to be working on a starship. She is new to the Cerritos at the start of the series, and helps introduce the audience to the setting and characters. Creator Mike McMahan believes he would act like Tendi if he ever got the chance to work on a starship. Wells was cast as Tendi for the series in July 2019. McMahan noted that the writers would be telling a story in the second season with the characters Beckett Mariner and D'Vana Tendi together. During her time on the ship, Tendi quickly befriends Sam Rutherford. She has experiences with an incredibly powerful dog that she creates, though Tendi, having never seen a real dog before, believes this is normal. The dog later flies away, leaving her. Later, Tendi befriends an Exocomp who dubs themself "Peanut Hamper", believing this is a regular name. Tendi and Peanut Hamper grow close, until Peanut Hamper betrays Tendi during a crisis and flies away to the enemy ship. After Shaxs sacrifices himself so an injured Rutherford can escape, Tendi stays by his side in the hospital until he wakes up. When he states he has amnesia, she is excited, as she looks forward to their friendship growing again. In the season 2 finale "First First Contact", Dr. T'Ana recommends Tendi for Senior Science Officer training, as she feels that Tendi's talents and potential extend past Medical. In Season 3, Tendi realizes that she wants to captain her own ship one day. Hinted at in Season 2 and confirmed in Season 3 is that Tendi's family are Orion pirates, a legacy that she is rebelling against, despite possessing formidable combat and pirating skills.

Rutherford

Sam Rutherford
Samanthan "Sam" Rutherford, or simply Rutherford (voiced by Eugene Cordero) is a human ensign aboard the Cerritos, Rutherford is adjusting to a new cyborg implant. McMahan compared Rutherford to the Star Trek: The Next Generation character Geordi La Forge, saying they are both "amazing at engineering stuff" but Rutherford does not always solve the problem like Geordi because he is still learning. Rutherford is a good friend of D'Vana Tendi in the series. In the season finale, Shaxs sacrifices himself for Rutherford so the latter can escape. Rutherford's implant is torn out in the process, so he gets amnesia. Tendi stays by his side in the hospital until he wakes up. When he states he has amnesia, she is excited, as she looks forward to their friendship growing again. It is revealed at the end of the second season that his cyborg implant was not elective surgery as he believed while he has lost his memories  and previous personality before, and in the third season, more sinister information about how and why he got the implant is revealed. It turns out that he was a pawn of a corrupt Starfleet admiral's scheme to advance in his own career, and Rutherford plays a role of thwarting it when the plan goes out of control. Afterward, Rutherford decides to keep the implant, which, although part of this criminal conspiracy, is simply too fascinatingly useful to remove.

Red Rutherford
In the third season episode "Reflections", Rutherford's implant malfunctions, allowing an alternate personality to take over. During a skirmish with security, Rutherford ends up in a coma. In his mindscape, Rutherford realizes that the personality, Samanthan "Red" Rutherford, is his younger "real" self, whose memories were saved before he received his implant a decade earlier (and who had briefly re-taken over his body numerous times offscreen throughout the previous two seasons), and whose "cool" personality traits were erased, including his life as an angry first year recruit in Starfleet who funded unsanctioned engineering projects by secretly building and illegally racing and winning space vehicles at Devron, challenging Rutherford to a race with any vehicle they can imagine; the winner getting control of their body. Rutherford wins by piloting a Delta Flyer crewed by his lower decks friends. Red concedes, seeing that his new life brought growth, and shares the real memory of how they got their implant before he disappears into his own consciousness: the younger Rutherford's experimental engine blew up, gravely injuring him, before shadowy members of Starfleet installed the implant to erase his memories of their own mysterious illegal activity, trapping Red within his own mind. While simply referred to as the younger Rutherford, Red's name is revealed via the episode's subtitles.

Carol Freeman
Carol Freeman (voiced by Dawnn Lewis) is the human captain of the Cerritos. McMahan described her as a capable Starfleet captain whose starship is not very important. Freeman does not want her daughter, Mariner, to be on the Cerritos and is looking for a reason to have her transferred to another ship. In the first-season finale, Freeman's relationship with Mariner is revealed, but by the end of the episode they realize they can work together rather than be enemies aboard the ship. In the second season, Freeman receives a scathing performance review that leads her to believe she needs to be less controlling of her away teams. She does not check in while Tendi, Rutherford, Mariner, and Jet Manhaver are in danger on a collector's ship, however they still make it out okay. A more serious incident occurs when she responds to a distress call without recalling an away team on extravehicular activity back on board first, leaving them stranded in space and recovered barely before their suits' life support systems were fatally depleted. In spite of these issues, Freeman is a candidate for reassignment to a more prestigious ship by the third season, but she has second thoughts about the reassignment upon learning that she won't be able to take her crew with her. In the fourth season, Freeman, based on her experiences with the Pakleds and other "legacy" planets, develops and presents a proposal for the Cerritos and other second contact ships to follow-up on planets and species that were the subject of brief Starfleet intervention without additional support (i.e., planets visited in one-off episodes of the original series and The Next Generation).

Jack Ransom
Jack Ransom (voiced by Jerry O'Connell) is the human first officer of the Cerritos, whom McMahan compared to Next Generations William Riker, if he was on speed and had less shame. He soon recognizes Boimler's considerable talents as an officer and becomes responsible for Mariner's final probationary period with full authority to dishonorably discharge her if she fails. Ransom is eventually satisfied at her progress, but he later witnesses Mariner in an unauthorized act that leads to a misunderstanding shared with the captain that is serious enough to drive Mariner to resign her commission. Eventually, Mariner returns to Starfleet and Ransom, to his horror, is assigned as her mentor for her newfound resolve to now seriously rise in the ranks.

Shaxs
Shaxs (voiced by Fred Tatasciore) is a Bajoran tactical officer aboard the Cerritos. Shaxs  is extremely aggressive with a warrior ethos and a willingness to go into battle. He has been described as a parody of both Worf and Kira Nerys, who is a former comrade of his. Shaxs dies in battle at the end of the first season while saving Rutherford but sacrificing himself. The second season introduces a new security chief for the Cerritos, and Shaxs returns in the third episode of season two, apparently revived by unspeakable methods. He is in a romantic relationship with Dr T'Ana. In addition, while he has little to do with the Lower Deckers, his opinion of Ensign Boimler dramatically changes for the better when the Ensign's determination to make up for an inadvertent insult is successful in enabling Shaxs to fulfill his favorite battle tactic of ejecting the warp core in a time of need.

T'Ana
 (voiced by Gillian Vigman) is a Caitian doctor and head of medical aboard the Cerritos. McMahan described her as "a good doctor, but she's an unpleasant cat." Including a Caitian in the series is a reference to Star Trek: The Animated Series which also starred a member of that species, M'Ress. She is in a romantic relationship with Shax, which includes playing out violent sexual fantasies in the holodeck.

Recurring characters

Barnes
Barnes (voiced by Jessica McKenna) is a female unjoined Trill ensign on the Cerritos. She is most often seen manning the Ops station on the bridge. Rutherford tries to date her twice, once in the first season and again in the second, but it doesn't work out either time.

Steve Stevens
Steve Stevens (voiced by Ben Rodgers) is a human lieutenant commander on the Cerritos. Rodgers is a writer for the series. He idolizes Ransom and is constantly trying to ingratiate himself with him.

Andy Billups
Andy Billups (voiced by Paul Scheer) is a human lieutenant commander and the chief engineer of the Cerritos, and the direct boss of Rutherford. A recurring character in the first three seasons, Billups is upgraded to the main cast in the fourth season. He is formerly Crown Prince on the planet, Hysperia, but abdicated his birthright for an engineering career in Starfleet, although his mother the Queen refuses to accept his decision and plots to force him to resign his commission and take the throne.

Vendome
Vendome (voiced by Sam Richardson) is a Bolian ensign on the Cerritos. In the season 3 episode "The Least Dangerous Game" the main characters discover that Vendome received a promotion to captain.

Cerritos computer
The USS Cerritos computer is voiced by Jessica McKenna.

Jet Manhaver
Jet Manhaver (voiced by Marcus Henderson) is a human lieutenant on the Cerritos. He dated Barbara Brinson before Boimler did. In season two, Jet competes with Mariner after Jet takes Boimler's position. Eventually, on a dangerous mission that goes south, the two realize they need to let Rutherford and Tendi take change, and they make it out alive.

Fletcher
Fletcher (voiced by Tim Robinson) is a human ensign on the Cerritos who is promoted to lieutenant and transferred to the Titan, before being fired from Starfleet.

Badgey
Badgey (voiced by Jack McBrayer) is a malfunctioning sentient hologram in the form of an anthropomorphic Starfleet badge. After Rutherford creates Badgey as a training simulation, but Badgey soon betrays his so-called "father". Rutherford, with Tendi's help, is able to subdue Badgey and freeze him to death. During the final moments of his life, Badgey apologizes to Rutherford for his misdoings. Rutherford reactivates Badgey in the season finale, realizing he is the only one who can help in his moment of need to deliver a virus to an alien ship attacking the Cerritos to destroy it. Badgey does so, but also activates the ship's self destruct to kill Rutherford out of revenge. Rutherford walks away, but with amnesia, but Shaxs, who was with him, is killed.  Much later, Rutherford discovers to his alarm that a new fleet of autonomous Starfleet ships, the Texas class, are controlled by artificial intelligences largely based on the same programming as Badgey. Sure enough, at the moment that those ships are assigned full autonomy by a renegade Starfleet admiral, the ships display the same violent psychopathic tendencies and have to be destroyed by the combined California class Starfleet fleet.

Jennifer Sh'reyan
Jennifer Sh'reyan (voiced by Lauren Lapkus) is an Andorian ensign on the Cerritos. At first antagonistic with Mariner, the two begin a romantic relationship sometime between Season 2 and 3. However, Jennifer ends the relationship due to a misunderstanding during Mariner's unauthorized interview with Victoria Nuzé. In the end of the Season 3 finale, Mariner shows no signs of repairing the relationship.

Kayshon
Kayshon (voiced by Carl Tart) is a Tamarian lieutenant on the Cerritos.

T'Lyn
T'Lyn (voiced by Gabrielle Ruiz) is a female Vulcan, formerly of the Vulcan ship, Sh'vhal. While as intellectually devoted as her comrades, T'Lyn causes friction by allowing her logical reasoning to be influenced by additional thought processes like intuition and instinct, and being stubborn enough to resist criticism of that way of thinking. The fact that this combination often allows her to develop reasonable conclusions and effective solutions is taken as evidence of her incompatibility with the crew. As such, the captain transfers her to Starfleet where her personality and talents would be more tolerated and valued. She is assigned to the USS Cerritos where she is boisterously welcomed by Ensign D'Vana Tendi as her new training partner.

Les Buenamigo
Les Buenamigo (voiced by Carlos Alazraqui) is a vice admiral and an old friend of Freeman. While initially portrayed as an ally towards her, Buenamigo is eventually revealed to have been behind Rutherford's memory loss in order to cover up his involvement in Buenamigo's illegal project to develop the fully automated Texas-class ships. When his crimes are discovered, Buenamigo gives one of his ships, the Aledo, full autonomy and orders it to destroy the Cerritos to cover up his crimes. However, the Aledo‘s rogue AI refuses and kills Buenamigo by firing phaser blasts directly into his office.

Guest characters

Introduced in previous series
 Q (voiced by John de Lancie, season 1), a member of the Q Continuum who accidentally teleports onto the Cerritos.
 Leonardo da Vinci (voiced by Gary Cole, season 1)
 William Riker (voiced by Jonathan Frakes, seasons 1–2), captain of the USS Titan After the end of the first season, McMahan confirmed that Jonathan Frakes would return as his Star Trek: The Next Generation character William Riker in the second season after guest starring in the first-season finale.
 Deanna Troi (voiced by Marina Sirtis, season 1), a character from The Next Generation. Along with the announcement that Frakes would reprise his role in a larger capacity in the second season of the series, it was also revealed that Marina Sirtis would  not return as Deanna Troi because "the stories didn't go that way". 
 Tom Paris (voiced by Robert Duncan McNeill, season 2), a character from Voyager. He visits the Cerritos on a handshake tour much to the excitement of Boimler.
 Borg Queen (voiced by Alice Krige, season 2), an antagonist that was introduced in First Contact and killed during the series finale of Voyager. Krige reprises the role, voicing the Borg Queen as a hologram in one of Starfleet's holographic training drills.
 Sonya Gomez (voiced by Lycia Naff, season 2), a character from the second season of The Next Generation. She appears as the captain of the USS Archimedes in the second-season finale of Lower Decks.
McMahan added that there would be other characters in the second season returning from previous Star Trek series, and said they would "come in a way that you don't expect". McMahan also stated in May 2021 that there would be "legacy guest roles" in the third season, but they would be "people you're not going to expect when you get them" which he felt was more surprising and satisfying for fans.
 Kira Nerys (voiced by Nana Visitor, season 3), a character from Deep Space Nine.
 Quark (voiced by Armin Shimerman, season 3), a character from Deep Space Nine.
 Hikaru Sulu (voiced by George Takei, season 3), a character from The Original Series. Takei reprises the role, voicing the character as a hallucination.

Introduced in season one 
 Alonzo Freeman (voiced by Phil LaMarr), Mariner's father and a Starfleet admiral
 K'orin (voiced by Jess Harnell), a Klingon general who Boimler and Mariner are set to transport to his planet.
 Quimp (voiced by Tom Kenny)
 An injured Bajoran crew member (voiced by Ryan Ridley)
 Vindor (voiced by Kevin Michael Richardson)
 O'Connor (voiced by Haley Joel Osment)
 Durango (voiced by Al Rodrigo)
 Barbara Brinson (voiced by Gillian Jacobs)
 Ron Docent (voiced by Matt Walsh)
 Angie (voiced by Kari Wahlgren), an old friend of Mariner's
 Niko (voiced by Nolan North), an old friend of Mariner's
 Asif (voiced by Asif Ali)
 Karavitus (voiced by Artemis Pebdani)
 A Drookmani captain (voiced by J.G. Hertzler)
 Amina Ramsey (voiced by Toks Olagundoye), who was confirmed by series creator Mike McMahan as Beckett Mariner's former lover at Starfleet Academy, even though it wasn't explicit.
 The old/young ensign (voiced by Nolan North)
 The Dog (voiced by Jennifer Hale), a superpowered dog created by Tendi.
 Clar (voiced by Kurtwood Smith)
 Captain Seartave (voiced by Kenneth Mitchell)
 Migleemo (voiced by Paul F. Tompkins), a psychologist. In June 2020, Newsome was asked by a fan on Twitter if comedian Paul F. Tompkins would have a guest role in the series given Newsome was a frequent guest on Tompkins' podcast Spontaneanation. Tompkins expressed interest in the idea, and McMahan responded to say that he was organizing to have Tompkins cast for a guest role in the series' second season. He ultimately appeared as Migleemo in both seasons one and two.
 Lemonts (voiced by Gabrielle Ruiz)
 Peanut Hamper (voiced by Kether Donohue), an Exocomp with an initially hidden self-serving sociopathic personality who joins the ensigns in the season one finale but later betrays them in their time of need. She eventually finds herself on an alien civilization, but plots to betray it as well to return to Starfleet's good graces. She is eventually exposed and imprisoned by Starfleet in a prison for malevolent artificially intelligent machines. 
 Titan lieutenant #1 (voiced by Echo Kellum)

References

Lower Decks
Star Trek: Lower Decks
Lower Decks